The Siberut langur (Presbytis siberu) is a species of monkey in the family Cercopithecidae.  It was formerly considered a subspecies of the Mentawai langur, Presbytis potenziani (as Presbytis potenziani siberu) but genetic analysis revealed that these are separate species.  The Siberut langur is native to the island of Siberut in Indonesia.  It is listed as endangered by the IUCN.

References

Presbytis
Primates of Indonesia
Taxa named by C. Boden Kloss
Taxa named by Frederick Nutter Chasen
Mammals described in 1928
Endangered fauna of Asia
Endemic fauna of Indonesia